Jesús María District may refer to:

 Jesús María District, Lima, Peru
 Jesús María District, San Mateo, in San Mateo (canton), Alajuela province, Costa Rica

See also
 Jesús María (disambiguation)